The Veazie Dam was a hydroelectric dam on the Penobscot River between Veazie and Eddington in Penobscot County, Maine. In 2010 the Penobscot River Restoration Trust bought the dam from PPL Corporation based on an agreement that was signed in 2004. Deconstruction of the dam began on July 22, 2013 as a part of an extensive project involving four dams to restore eleven species of sea-run fish to the Penobscot River. The Veazie Dam was the furthest downstream of the dams on the Penobscot River; now the Milford and Orono Dam dams are furthest downstream, albeit on separate side of Marsh Island.

References

Dams in Maine
Penobscot River
Buildings and structures in Penobscot County, Maine
Hydroelectric power plants in Maine
Dams completed in 1912
1912 establishments in Maine
Former dams